The Monte-Carlo Philharmonic Orchestra (OPMC) is the main orchestra in the Principality of Monaco. The orchestra gives concerts primarily in the Auditorium Rainier III, but also performs at the Salle des Princes in the Grimaldi Forum.

History
The orchestra was founded in 1856 and gave its first concert on 14 December 1856, with an ensemble of 15 musicians, at the "Maison de jeux" (the future casino), under the direction of Alexandre Hermann.  By 1874, the orchestra had increased in size to 70 musicians, in particular during the leadership of Eusèbe Lucas.  In 1953, Prince Rainier III had ordered the renaming of the ensemble to L'Orchestre National de l'Opéra de Monte-Carlo.  The orchestra acquired its current name in 1980, again through Rainier III.

Past principal conductors of the orchestra have included Paul Paray, Louis Frémaux, Igor Markevitch, Lovro von Matačić, Lawrence Foster, Gianluigi Gelmetti, James DePreist, Marek Janowski, and Yakov Kreizberg.  Kreizberg had originally been signed to a contract of five years, but his tenure was truncated by his death in March 2011.  In March 2012, the OPMC and its president, Princess Caroline of Monaco, announced the return of Gelmetti to the orchestra as chef référent to provide interim artistic leadership for the orchestra.  In January 2013, the OPMC formalised the full re-appointment of Gelmetti as its artistic director and music director.  Gelmetti concluded his second OPMC tenure after the 2015–2016 season and subsequently took the title of honorary conductor.

Kazuki Yamada first guest-conducted the OPMC in 2011.  In the fall of 2013, he became the OPMC's principal guest conductor.  In April 2015, the OPMC announced the appointment of Yamada as its next principal conductor and artistic director, effective September 2016, with an initial contract of three years.  In September 2020, the OPMC announced the most recent contract extension for Yamada, through the 2023-2024 season.

Principal Conductors

 Alexandre Hermann
 Carlo Allegri (1860–1861)
 Eusèbe Lucas (1861–1871)
 Arthur Steck (1885–1894)
 Léon Jehin (1894–1928)
 Paul Paray (1928–1933)
 Henri Tomasi (1946–1947)
 Louis Frémaux (1956–1965)
 Claudio Scimone (1965–1967)
 Igor Markevitch (1967–1972)
 Lovro von Matačić (1972–1979)
 Lawrence Foster (1980–1990)
 Gianluigi Gelmetti (1990–1991)
 James DePreist (1994–1998)
 Marek Janowski (2000–2006)
 Yakov Kreizberg (2009–2011)
 Gianluigi Gelmetti (2013–2016)
 Kazuki Yamada (2016–present)

Selected discography 
 Fantasies, Rhapsodies and Daydreams. Works by Camille Saint-Saëns, Maurice Ravel, Ralph Vaughan Williams, Pablo de Sarasate, Jules Massenet. Arabella Steinbacher, Lawrence Foster, Orchestre Philharmonique de Monte-Carlo. PENTATONE PTC 5186536 (2016).

References

External links
 Official orchestra homepage, French-language version
 HarrisonParrott agency press release on the death of Yakov Kreizberg, 20 March 2011

1856 establishments in Monaco
Musical groups established in 1856
Monegasque orchestras